Jack N. Dyer (July 29, 1924 – August 10, 2003) was an American politician. He served as a Democratic member of the Louisiana House of Representatives.

Life and career
Dyer was born in East Baton Rouge parish, Louisiana, in 1924. He attended Louisiana State University, where he earned his Bachelor of Science degree and law degree. He served in the United States Army Air Corps.

In 1960, Dyer was elected to the Louisiana House of Representatives. He represented East Baton Rouge, Louisiana. In 1964, he left office and ran as a candidate to serve as a insurance commissioner, but was beaten at the polls by opponent Speedy Long. He resided in Baton Rouge, Louisiana.

Dyer died on August 10, 2003.

References 

1924 births
2003 deaths
Democratic Party members of the Louisiana House of Representatives
20th-century American politicians
Louisiana State University alumni
Politicians from Baton Rouge, Louisiana